The Uganda women's national football team is the national women's football team of Uganda and is controlled by the Federation of Uganda Football Associations.

History
FUFA President Lawrence Mulindwa addressed this in 2007, saying, "We had a girls' tournament in Luweero earlier this year and top players are going to be assembled into a national team to contest at the inaugural CECAFA Women's Challenge Cup to be held in Zanzibar in October." The tournament though was never played.

Team image

Nicknames
The Uganda women's national football team has been known or nicknamed as the "Crested Cranes".

Results and fixtures
The following is a list of match results in the last 12 months, as well as any future matches that have been scheduled.

Legend

2022

2023
Source :global sport

Coaching staff

Current coaching staff

Manager history

Faridah Bulega (????–2022)
  George Lutalo (2022–)

Players

Current squad
This is the final Squad named on June 2022 For 2022 Africa Women Cup of Nations   .

Caps and goals accurate up to and including 12 April 2021.

Recent call-ups
The following players have been called up to a Uganda squad in the past 12 months.

INJ Player withdrew from the squad due to an injury.
PRE Preliminary squad.
SUS Player is serving a suspension.
WD Player withdrew for personal reasons.

Previous squads

Africa Women Cup of Nations
2000 African Women's Championship squad
2022 Women's Africa Cup of Nations squads 
CECAFA Women's Championship
2022 CECAFA Women's Championship squads

Records

Players in bold are still active, at least at club level.

Most capped players

Top goalscorers

Competitive record

FIFA Women's World Cup

*Draws include knockout matches decided on penalty kicks.

Olympic Games

*Draws include knockout matches decided on penalty kicks.

Africa Women Cup of Nations

*Draws include knockout matches decided on penalty kicks.

African Games

CECAFA Women's Championship

Honours

Regional
CECAFA Women's Championship
  Champions: 2020

All−time record against FIFA recognized nations
The list shown below shows the Djibouti national football team all−time international record against opposing nations.
*As of xxxxxx after match against xxxx.
Key

Record per opponent
*As ofxxxxx after match against xxxxx.
Key

The following table shows Djibouti's all-time official international record per opponent:

See also

Sport in Uganda
Football in Uganda
Women's football in Uganda
Uganda women's national under-20 football team
Uganda women's national under-17 football team
Uganda men's national football team

References

External links
FIFA Profile

 
African women's national association football teams